Björn Barta (born May 22, 1980 in Berlin) is a German professional ice hockey player. He is currently playing for Füchse Duisburg of the third tier German Oberliga. He previously played with ERC Ingolstadt of the Deutsche Eishockey Liga (DEL). He re-joined the Panthers from fellow DEL club, the Thomas Sabo Ice Tigers.

Playing career
Barta grew up in West Berlin, skating from the age of three, joined at the age of five with junior club Berlin Schlittschuhclub. Due to the better prospects, he moved as a 13-year-old in the youth section of the Eisbären Berlin.  At the age of 17 years Barta went to the Swedish junior league for Mora IK. After one year he returned to Germany and signed a contract with the Heilbronner EC. He played as a winger for two years in the 2nd Bundesliga, where he developed into one of the top performers in the team.

In the 2000–01 season, Barta transferred for the league rivals SC Bietigheim-Bissingen on the ice, one year later he accepted an offer of Kölner Haie and made his debut appearances in the Deutsche Eishockey Liga. First, Barta was loaned to its affiliates partner EV Duisburg, but during the season he established himself as a winger in the fourth row of the Sharks. At the end of the season the Berliner celebrated the German championship. However, in order to get more ice time he moved to the Augsburger Panther, for whom he played three years. Since the season 2005–06 the attacker played at ERC Ingolstadt, with whom he in the first two years play-offs reached there but was eliminated in each case in the quarterfinals. For 2007–08 season, he signed a contract with league rivals Thomas Sabo Ice Tigers, where he fulfilled his contract until 2012.

Since the 2012–13 season he returned to play again for ERC Ingolstadt.

References

External links

1980 births
Living people
Augsburger Panther players
ERC Ingolstadt players
Kölner Haie players
Thomas Sabo Ice Tigers players
German ice hockey left wingers
Ice hockey people from Berlin